"Lady" is a song by American rock musician Lenny Kravitz, released as the final single from his seventh studio album, Baptism (2004), in November 2004. The song is believed to be written about Kravitz's then-girlfriend, Nicole Kidman. The song reached number 27 in the United States and number 99 in the Netherlands.

Chart performance
"Lady" was the most successful song from Baptism on the US Billboard Hot 100, where it peaked at number 27. It also charted briefly in the Netherlands, reaching number 99 in July 2005.

Music video
The video was directed by Philip Andelman. It consists of Kravitz playing guitar and singing in a circular stage, while women are dancing around him. There are lights that change depending on the intensity of the sound of the song.

Track listings
European CD single
 "Lady" 		
 "Are You Gonna Go My Way" (live at WXRK, New York City)

European maxi-CD single
 "Lady" 		
 "Are You Gonna Go My Way" (live at WXRK, New York City)
 "Always on the Run" (live at WXRK, New York City)

Charts

Release history

References

External links
  Lenny Kravitz official site

Lenny Kravitz songs
2005 singles
2004 songs
Music videos directed by Philip Andelman
Song recordings produced by Lenny Kravitz
Songs written by Craig Ross
Songs written by Lenny Kravitz
Virgin Records singles